Mourad Delhoum (born October 1987 in Sétif) is an Algerian footballer who plays as central midfielder for Algerian Ligue Professionnelle 2 club MC El Eulma.

Delhoum is the cousin of former Algerian international forward Rafik Saïfi.

International career
Delhoum was a member of the Algerian Under-23 National Team at the 2007 All-Africa Games. He also participated in the qualifiers for the 2008 Summer Olympics.

Honours
 Won the Algerian League twice with ES Sétif in 2007 and 2009 and 2012
 Won the Arab Champions League twice with ES Sétif in 2007 and 2008
 Won the North African Cup of Champions once with ES Sétif in 2009
 Won the Algerian Cup once with ES Sétif in 2010 and 2012
 Won the North African Cup Winners Cup once with ES Sétif in 2010
 Finalist in the CAF Confederation Cup once with ES Sétif in 2009
 Won the 2013–14 Saudi Crown Prince Cup once with Al-Nassr in 2014
 Saudi Professional League (1): 2013–14

References

1985 births
Algerian footballers
Living people
ES Sétif players
Footballers from Sétif
Algeria A' international footballers
Algeria under-23 international footballers
2011 African Nations Championship players
Amal Bou Saâda players
Algerian expatriate footballers
Expatriate footballers in Saudi Arabia
Algerian expatriate sportspeople in Saudi Arabia
Al Nassr FC players
JS Kabylie players
MC Oran players
Association football midfielders
Saudi Professional League players
21st-century Algerian people